Seven ships have been named John Williams after the missionary John Williams. All were owned and operated as missionary ships by the London Missionary Society, and were funded by donations from children.

 , a barque, launched in 1844 and wrecked in 1864 off Pukapuka, Cook Islands.
 , a barque, launched in 1865, wrecked off Niue in 1867.
 , a barque, bought in 1873, sold in 1894, or 1895.
 , a clipper-bowed barquentine with auxiliary steam propulsion, built in 1893, and sold in 1930.
 , a steel-hulled 3-masted staysail schooner with auxiliary power, used in World War II to evacuate settlers and carry supplies, and wrecked in 1948 off Samoa.
 , a coastal freighter, built in 1946, and bought in 1948 for missionary use in the Gilbert and Ellice Islands.
 , built in 1962, based at Tarawa, Gilbert Islands, and decommissioned in 1968.

See also
 John Williams (disambiguation)

References

Missionary ships
Set index articles on ships